Spring Meadows may refer to:

Spring Meadows, New Jersey
Spring Meadows Elementary School
Spring Meadow Lake State Park
Spring Meadows, Alderman's Head & Cow Croft Meadows